Andrea Whitcombe (born 8 June 1971) is a female former British International distance runner and triathlete.

Athletics career
Whitcombe won the English National Cross Country Championships three times (1990, 1991, 1997) and competed at the World Cross Country Championships seven times.

She won a silver medal in the 5000 metres representing England at the 1998 Commonwealth Games in Kuala Lumpur, Malaysia, and represented Great Britain in the same event at the 2000 Summer Olympics, before switching to the triathlon in 2001.

Triathlon career
She finished in the top 10 at the World Triathlon Championships three times, and was the 2004 British Olympic reserve. In 2005, she won a bronze medal at the World Duathlon Championships, and won the ITU Triathlon World Cup event in Corner Brook, Canada.

International competitions

Personal life
Whitcombe has two children, a son Aeron and a daughter Willow.

References

1971 births
Living people
British female middle-distance runners
British female triathletes
Olympic athletes of Great Britain
Athletes (track and field) at the 2000 Summer Olympics
Commonwealth Games medallists in athletics
Commonwealth Games silver medallists for England
Athletes (track and field) at the 1998 Commonwealth Games
Triathletes at the 2006 Commonwealth Games
Athletes from London
Medallists at the 1998 Commonwealth Games